Paul Alain Bingan (born 29 May 1987 in Douala) is a professional Cameroonian  footballer currently free agent.

Trivia 
He began his career by Authentic F.C. Douala before transferred to Cotonsport Garoua, 2008 left the team.

External links
Profile and Pictures - www.cotonsport.com

1987 births
Living people
Cameroonian footballers
Coton Sport FC de Garoua players
Association football midfielders